The Great Central League was a short-lived baseball league of four teams that played baseball in the upper Midwest of the United States in . The league and four teams were owned by Minneapolis-based strip club owner, Dick Jacobson, who previously attempted to purchase the Rochester Aces of the Northern League. 

In an effort to bring notoriety to the league, Jacobson signed Boston Red Sox Hall of Fame member George Scott as manager for the Minneapolis Millers. However his presence from the dugout did not help the team or league draw larger crowds to games. The league folded before holding a championship game because it was underfunded, use facilities ill-equipped for professional baseball, and was run by inexperienced management.

Teams
Champaign-Urbana Bandits
Lafayette Leopards (baseball)
Mason City Bats
Minneapolis Millers (Great Central League)

Standings

References

External links 

Defunct minor baseball leagues in the United States
Defunct independent baseball leagues in the United States
Baseball leagues in Iowa
Baseball leagues in Illinois
Baseball leagues in Indiana
Baseball leagues in Minnesota